Secretary of the Treasury most commonly refers to the United States Secretary of the Treasury.

Secretary of the Treasury may also refer to:

Confederate States of America Secretary of the Treasury
Secretary of the Treasury (Liberia), replaced by the Minister of Finance in 1972
Secretary to the Treasury (Sri Lanka), an office within the Ministry of Finance, Economic Stabilization and National Policies
Secretary to the Treasury, one of several positions in the United Kingdom
Secretary for the Treasury (Hong Kong) (under Financial Secretary)

See also
Minister of Finance